Parijatha is a 2012 Indian Kannada-language romantic comedy film directed by Prabhu Srinivas starring Diganth, Aindrita Ray and Sharan.

The film is a remake of the Tamil film Boss Engira Bhaskaran starring Arya and Nayantara.  The film was a musical hit with the soundtrack and score composed by Mano Murthy. The film also received appreciation for its neat screenplay.

Cast

Soundtrack
The songs for the film were composed by Mano Murthy. The song "Oh Parijatha" ranked fourth among the South India's top 20 songs list in Nokia Ovi Store and also another song "Nee Mohisu" has occupied the 12th position in South Top 20 songs list in Nokia Ovi Store.

Release
Parijatha was released in only eighteen movie theaters in Bangalore.

Reception

Critical response 

Srikanth Srinivasa from Rediff.com scored the film at 3.5 out of 5 stars and says "Srinivas's cinematography is pleasing; a major portion of the film was shot in Mysore. Director Prabhu Srinivas has remained faithful to the Tamil original. This is a film for those who are in love. Go for it and enjoy". A critic from Bangalore Mirror wrote  "Sharan is the star performer in this film. Mukhyamantri Chandru has made one of his rare appearances in films of late. Parijata, billed as Valentine’s Day special, does not live up to its expectations". A critic from News18 India wrote "Sreenivas' camera work makes a very good impact. 'Parijatha' is an enjoyable comedy film, thanks to chemistry of the lead pair Diggy and Andy". A critic from NDTV wrote "Mano Murthy's music and background score gel with the mood of the film. The title song and "Nee Mohisu" are good compositions".

References

External links 

2012 films
2010s Kannada-language films
Films shot in India
Kannada remakes of Tamil films
Films scored by Mano Murthy
Films directed by Prabhu Srinivas